Good Feeling is an EP by American rapper Flo Rida. It was released exclusively in Australia on April 6, 2012, to promote his tour there and features some of his biggest hits.

Track listing
iTunes EP and physical edition
 "Good Feeling"
 "Wild Ones" (featuring Sia)
 "Club Can't Handle Me (featuring David Guetta)
 "Turn Around (5, 4, 3, 2, 1)"
 "Who Dat Girl" (featuring Akon)
 "Low" (featuring T-Pain)
 "Good Feeling" (Carl Tricks remix)
 "Good Feeling" (Jaywalker remix)

Charts

References

2012 EPs
Flo Rida albums
Albums produced by Benny Blanco
Albums produced by David Guetta
Albums produced by Dr. Luke